Ecclesia in Africa is a post-synodal apostolic exhortation written by Pope John Paul II, published on 14 September 1995. It follows the 1994 Special Assembly for Africa of the Synod of Bishops which was held in Rome.

References

External links 

 

Apostolic exhortations
1995 documents
Documents of Pope John Paul II
1995 in Christianity
Catholicism in Africa